Scott Williams may refer to:

Scott Williams (artist) (born 1956), stencil artist
Scott Williams (basketball) (born 1968), American basketball player
Scott Williams (American football coach), first head coach of the Illinois college football program 
Scott Williams (comics), American comic book artist and inker
Scott Williams (cricketer) (born 1971), Australian cricketer
Scott Williams (darts player) (born 1990), English darts player
Scott Williams (field hockey) (born 1971), American field hockey defender
Scott Williams (figure skater) (born c. 1966), American figure skater
Scott Williams (footballer) (born 1974), Welsh professional footballer for Wrexham
Scott Williams (musician) (died 2004), American bassist in the band Soilent Green
Scott Williams (rugby player) (born 1990), Wales international rugby union player
Scott Williams (running back) (born 1962), American football running back
Scott Williams (serial killer) (born 1963), American convicted serial killer
Scott A. Williams, American television writer and producer
Scott W. Williams (born 1943), American mathematician

See also
Scot Williams (born 1972), English actor and producer